Ronald Fraser (11 April 1930 – 13 March 1997) was a British character actor, who appeared in numerous British plays, films and television shows from the 1950s to the 1990s. An unusual appearance and unique delivery made him a natural comedic actor. Fraser was a familiar figure in West End clubs during the sixties, and despite a long-standing reputation as one of the hardest drinking of British actors he was still working in his last years. He was perhaps best known as Basil "Badger" Allenby-Johnson in the 1970s television series The Misfit.

Background
Ronald Fraser was born in Ashton-under-Lyne, Lancashire, the son of an interior decorator and builder from Scotland. He attended Ashton Grammar School. He was educated in Scotland and did national service as a lieutenant in the Seaforth Highlanders.

While serving in Benghazi in North Africa, he appeared in the comic play French Without Tears by Terence Rattigan. He trained as an actor at RADA until 1953 and soon appeared at Glasgow's Citizens' Theatre. He joined the Old Vic repertory company in 1954, making his first London appearance in The Good Sailor, a stage adaptation of Herman Melville's novel, Billy Budd.

In the West End, he appeared in The Long and the Short and the Tall, The Ginger Man, The Singular Man, Androcles and the Lion, The Showing Up of Blanco Posnet, Purple Dust by Seán O'Casey, Entertaining Mr Sloane, Joseph Papp's production of The Pirates of Penzance and High Society. He also played Falstaff in a production of The Merry Wives of Windsor at the Open Air Theatre, Regent's Park. His only Broadway show was the flop La Grosse Valise by Robert Dhéry, Gérard Calvi and Harold Rome.

He appeared in numerous television roles from 1954, and in nearly 50 films from 1957, mostly in comedies.

Selected filmography

Film credits

 Black Ice (1957) – Tom
 Bobbikins (1959) – Sailor Joe (uncredited)
 There Was a Crooked Man (1960) – Gen. Cummins
 The Sundowners (1960) – Ocker
 The Long and the Short and the Tall (1961) – L / Cpl. Macleish
 Don't Bother to Knock (1961) – Fred
 The Best of Enemies (1961) – Perfect
 Raising the Wind (1961) 
 The Hellions (1961) – Frank
 The Pot Carriers (1962) – Red Band
 The Girl on the Boat (1962) – Colonel (uncredited)
 In Search of the Castaways (1962) – Guard at Dockyard Gate
 Private Potter (1962) – Doctor
 The Punch and Judy Man (1963) – Mayor Palmer
 The V.I.P.s (1963) – Joslin
 Girl in the Headlines (1963) – Sgt. Saunders
 The Beauty Jungle (1964) – Walter Carey
 Victim Five (1964) – Inspector Lean
 Crooks in Cloisters (1964) – Walt
 The Counterfeit Constable (1964) – Sergent Timothy Reagan
 Daylight Robbery (1964)
 Flight of the Phoenix (1965) – Sergeant Watson
 The Whisperers (1967) – Charlie Ross
 Fathom (1967) – Colonel Campbell
 Sebastian (1968) – Toby
 The Killing of Sister George (1968) – Leo Lockhart
 Sinful Davey (1969) – MacNab
 The Bed Sitting Room (1969) – The Army
 Too Late the Hero (1970) – Pvt. Campbell
 The Rise and Rise of Michael Rimmer (1970) – Tom Hutchinson
 The Magnificent Seven Deadly Sins (1971) – George (segment "Wrath")
 Ooh... You Are Awful (1972) – Reggie Campbell Peek
 Rentadick (1972) – Major Upton
 Swallows and Amazons (1974) – Uncle Jim
 Percy's Progress (1974) – Bleeker
 Paper Tiger (1975) – Sergeant Forster
 Hardcore (1977) – Marty
 Come Play With Me (1977) – Slasher
 The Wild Geese (1978) – Jock McTaggart
 Trail of the Pink Panther (1982) – Dr. Longet
 Tangiers (1985) – Jenkins
 Absolute Beginners (1986) – Amberley Drove
 Scandal (1989) – Justice Marshall
 Let Him Have It (1991) – Niven's Judge
 The Mystery of Edwin Drood (1993) – Dean

Television credits

 The Invisible Man (1959) – Sharp
 Danger Man (1961) – Giuseppe Morelli
 The Ordeal of Dr. Shannon (1962) – Dr. James Mathers
 The Avengers   (The Gravediggers) (1965) – Sir Horace Winslip
 Sword of Honour (1967) – Apthorpe
 The Misfit (1970–1971) – Basil Allenby-Johnson
 The Rivals of Sherlock Holmes (1973) – Horrocks
 Pygmalion (1973) – Col. Pickering
 Melissa (1974) – Felix Hepburn
 The Sweeney (1976) – Titus Oates
 Pennies From Heaven (1978) – Major Archibald Paxville
 The Famous Five (1978) – Mr. Barling
 Spooner's Patch (1979) as Inspector Spooner (1979)
 Brideshead Revisited (1981) – Red-Haired Man
 Minder (1985–1989) – Self-Inflicted Sid / Albert Goddard
 Lovejoy (1986–1991) – Michael Edwards / Drummer
 Life Without George (1987–1989) – Harold Chambers
 Doctor Who (The Happiness Patrol) (1988) – Joseph C.
 Taggart (1992) – Angus Collins
 The Blackheath Poisonings (1992) –  Doctor Porter
 The Young Indiana Jones Chronicles (1993) – Donald
 TFI Friday (1996) – Himself

Personal life
Fraser was a resident of Hampstead, London. He was a heavy drinker and a well-known figure in the local hostelries. He was married from 1956 to 1964 to Elizabeth Howe, and the couple had two daughters.

He died of a haemorrhage, aged 66, in London on 13 March 1997.

References

External links

 
 
 
 

English male television actors
English male film actors
People educated at Ashton-under-Lyne Grammar School
People from Ashton-under-Lyne
Actors from Lancashire
English people of Scottish descent
Alumni of RADA
1930 births
1997 deaths
Seaforth Highlanders officers
20th-century English male actors
20th-century British Army personnel